{{DISPLAYTITLE:C3H3}}
The molecular formula C3H3 (molar mass: 39.06 g/mol, exact mass: 39.0235 u) may refer to:

 Cyclopropenium
 Propargyl